is a subway station in Chiyoda, Tokyo, Japan, operated by the Tokyo subway operator Tokyo Metro. The station is located in the Kasumigaseki government district.

Lines 
Kasumigaseki Station is served by the following three Tokyo Metro lines.
  (M-15)
  (H-07)
  (C-08)

Station layout
The platforms for Marunouchi Line serving two tracks consist of one island platform and one side platform. One side of the island platform is closed off by a fence. The platform for the Hibiya Line is an island platform serving two tracks. The platform for the Chiyoda Line is an island platform serving two tracks.

The platforms for the Chiyoda Line and the Marunouchi Line are not directly connected, and transferring passengers need to walk through the Hibiya Line platform, which takes about five minutes.

Platforms

History 
 15 October 1958: The Marunouchi Line station opens.
 25 March 1964: The Hibiya Line station opens.
 20 March 1971: The Chiyoda Line station opens.
 15 March 1995: Aum Shinrikyo attempts a biological attack by surreptitiously spreading Botulinum toxin in the station. There are no known casualties.
 20 March 1995: Sarin gas attack targets the station.
 1 April 2004: Ownership of the station is transferred to Tokyo Metro owing to the privatization of the Teito Rapid Transit Authority (TRTA).
 6 June 2020: Start of services on the TH Liner

Surrounding area
 Sakuradamon Station
 Tokyo Metropolitan Police Department
 National Police Agency
 Ministry of Foreign Affairs
 Ministry of Finance
 Ministry of Economy, Trade and Industry
 Japan Post Holdings
 Hibiya Park
 Inner Circular Route Kasumigaseki

See also
 List of railway stations in Japan
 Kasumigaseki Station (Saitama), a station in Saitama Prefecture with the same name

References

External links 
 Tokyo Metro station information 
 Tokyo Metro station information 

Railway stations in Japan opened in 1958
Railway stations in Tokyo
Tokyo Metro Hibiya Line
Tokyo Metro Marunouchi Line
Tokyo Metro Chiyoda Line
Stations of Tokyo Metro